Old Hutch is a 1936 American romantic comedy film directed by J. Walter Ruben and starring Wallace Beery as a man who finds $100,000 in the depths of the Depression. It is a remake of the 1920 Will Rogers film Honest Hutch. The supporting cast features Eric Linden, Cecilia Parker, Robert McWade, Virginia Grey, Donald Meek and George Chandler.

Cast
Wallace Beery as Hutch Hutchins
Eric Linden as Dave Jolly
Cecilia Parker as Irene Hutchins
Robert McWade as Mr. Jolly
Caroline Perkins as Carrie Hutchins
Julia Perkins as Julie Hutchins
Delmar Watson as Allie Hutchins
Harry Watson as Freddie Hutchins
Virginia Grey as Ethel (in drugstore)
Donald Meek as Mr. Gunnison
George Chandler as Cigar Store Clerk

References

External links 
 

1936 films
1930s English-language films
1936 romantic comedy films
Films directed by J. Walter Ruben
Metro-Goldwyn-Mayer films
American black-and-white films
American romantic comedy films
Films produced by Harry Rapf
1930s American films
Remakes of American films